Avusahibthottam is a village in the Thanjavur taluk of Thanjavur district, Tamil Nadu.

Demographics 
As per the 2001 census, Avusahibthottam had a total population of 397 with 192 males and 205 females. The sex ratio was 1068. The literacy rate was 77.03.

External links
 

Villages in Thanjavur district